Rumex skottsbergii, or more commonly known as lava dock, is a shrub of the genus Rumex. The genus comprises approximately 200 species all derived from a single species and are therefore monophyletic. A similar plant in this genus is Rumex giganteus. Their similarity lies between their erect nature and leaves. However, the difference lies in their inflorescences. The inflorescences is described as being a cluster of flowers from the main stem axis .

Description 
Rumex skottsbergii can be identified through their green, narrow, compact inflorescences, erect nature and small leaves. Their stems are usually stiffly erect with 7-10dm long and glabrous. Rumex skottsbergii can also be identified through their unisexual flowers and medium-sized yellowish greenish branched inflorescences; their outer tepals are also a distinguishable trait found within this genus.

Distribution 
Rumex skottsbergii are found in Hawaii and are species that flourish in low elevation and open lava fields.

Uses 
Rumex skottsbergii was used for medicinal purposes and was used to treat a childhood's diseases known as pāʻaoʻao  and constipation. The childhood disease would cause physical weakening.

References

skottsbergii
Endemic flora of Hawaii
Plants described in 1971
Flora without expected TNC conservation status